Anastas'yevka, also known as Anastas'evka (Anastasevka, اناستاسەۆكا; , Anastas'yevka) is a town in Aktobe Region, west Kazakhstan.

References

Aktobe Region
Cities and towns in Kazakhstan